Kamio (written: 神尾 lit. "god tail") is a Japanese surname. Notable people with the surname include:

, Japanese writer
, Japanese violinist
, Japanese Imperial Army general
, Japanese actress
, Japanese manga artist and writer
, Japanese tennis player

See also
Kamio Station, a railway station in Shizuoka Prefecture, Japan

Japanese-language surnames